Jazin Rural District is a rural district (dehestan) in the Central District of Bajestan County, Razavi Khorasan Province, Iran. At the 2006 census, its population was 5,294, in 1,533 families.  The rural district has 18 villages.

References 

Rural Districts of Razavi Khorasan Province
Bajestan County